Hoi Fung "Eric" Kwong (born 23 October 1982 in Hong Kong) is an auto racing driver from Hong Kong. He has raced in the Hong Kong Touring Car Championship but is best known for his appearance in the World Touring Car Championship.

Racing career

Hong Kong Touring Car Championship
Kwong has driven in the Hong Kong Touring Car Championship since 2009. He finished third in 2010, second in 2011 and he won the title in 2012 driving a Super 2000 Honda Accord having won five out of the eight races.

World Touring Car Championship
He made his debut in the World Touring Car Championship at the 2012 FIA WTCC Race of China, driving a naturally aspirated Chevrolet Cruze LT for Look Fong Racing Team. He qualified in 24th place for the race, fastest of the naturally aspirated cars, and his best result of the weekend was 18th in race one.

Racing record

Complete World Touring Car Championship results
(key) (Races in bold indicate pole position) (Races in italics indicate fastest lap)

TCR Spa 500 results

References

External links
Profile at fiawtcc.com

1982 births
Hong Kong racing drivers
World Touring Car Championship drivers
TCR Asia Series drivers
Living people
Craft-Bamboo Racing drivers